Darwiniothamnus is a genus of flowering plants in the sunflower family.

 Species
All three species are endemic to the Galápagos Islands.
 Darwiniothamnus alternifolius Lawesson & Adsersen 
 Darwiniothamnus lancifolius (Hook.f.) Harling 
 Darwiniothamnus tenuifolius (Hook.f.) Harling

References

 
Asteraceae genera
Flora of the Galápagos Islands
Taxonomy articles created by Polbot